The giant sea catfish (Arius gigas), also called the ewe or the marine catfish, is a species of sea catfish in the family Ariidae. It was described by George Albert Boulenger in 1911, originally under the genus Tachysurus. It is known from brackish and freshwater in the Burkina Faso, Ivory Coast, Cameroon, Benin, Mali, Ghana and Nigeria. Males incubate eggs in their mouths.

The giant sea catfish is of commercial significance as a food fish; however, its populations have declined due to over-fishing, and possibly chemical pollution.

References

gigas
Fish described in 1911